This is a list of Maltese football transfers for the 2009-10 summer transfer window by club. Only transfers of clubs in the Maltese Premier League are included. However, this includes clubs that may be moved to a different division during the season.

The summer transfer window opened on 1 July 2009, although a few transfers may take place prior to that date. The window closed at midnight on 31 August 2009. Players without a club may join one at any time, either during or in between transfer windows.

Player transfers

Birkirkara

In:

 

 
 

Out:

Dingli Swallows

In:

 

 

Out:

Floriana

In:

 

 

 
 

Out:

Hibernians

In:

Out:

Marsaxlokk

In:

Out:

Qormi

In:

 

 

 
 
 

Out:

Sliema Wanderers

In:

 

 

Out:

Tarxien Rainbows

In:

 

Out:

Valletta

In:

 

 

 
 
 

Out:

Vittoriosa Stars

In:

Out:

Manager transfers

See also
 List of Belgian football transfers summer 2009
 List of Danish football transfers summer 2009
 List of Dutch football transfers summer 2009
 List of English football transfers summer 2009
 List of French football transfers summer 2009
 List of German football transfers summer 2009
 List of Greek football transfers summer 2009
 List of Italian football transfers summer 2009
 List of Scottish football transfers 2009–10
 List of Spanish football transfers summer 2009

References

External links
 Official Website

Maltese
2009
Transfers